Dávid Pákolicz (born 13 September 1984 in Kalocsa) is a Hungarian football player who currently plays for Nyíregyháza Spartacus.

References

1984 births
Living people
People from Kalocsa
Hungarian footballers
Association football midfielders
Győri ETO FC players
Integrál-DAC footballers
Nyíregyháza Spartacus FC players
Pécsi MFC players
Nemzeti Bajnokság I players
Sportspeople from Bács-Kiskun County